Mount Iveagh is a broad mountain in the Supporters Range of Antarctica, overlooking the east side of Mill Glacier  northwest of Mount White. This  peak is located between Keltie Glacier and Mill Glacier, on the east side of Beardmore Glacier. It was discovered by the British Antarctic Expedition, 1907–09, and named for Edward Guinness, 1st Earl of Iveagh, of the firm of Guinness, who helped finance the expedition.

References

Mountains of the Ross Dependency
Queen Maud Mountains
Dufek Coast